The 10th edition of the annual Holland Ladies Tour was held from September 3 to September 8, 2007. The women's stage race with an UCI rating of 2.1 started in Valkenburg, and ended in Denekamp.

Stages

2007-09-03: Valkenburg — Berg en Terblijt (97.6 km)

2007-09-04: Leende — Leende (105.3 km)

2007-09-05: Apeldoorn — Apeldoorn (97.8 km)

2007-09-06: Roden — Roden (112.2 km)

2007-09-07: Nijverdal — Nijverdal (103.4 km)

2007-09-08: Denekamp — Denekamp (85.1 km)

2007-09-08: Nordhorn — Denekamp (19.9 km)

Final standings

General Classification

Points Classification

Mountains Classification

Best Young Rider Classification

Sprint Classification

Most Aggressive Rider Classification

References 
 cyclingnews
 live-radsport

2007
Holland Ladies Tour
Holland Ladies Tour
Cycle races in Germany
Cycling in Overijssel
Cycling in Apeldoorn
Cycling in Heeze-Leende
Cycling in Hellendoorn
Cycling in Noordenveld
Cycling in Valkenburg aan de Geul
Sport in Dinkelland
Sport in Lower Saxony
County of Bentheim (district)